"Doin' What She Likes" is a song recorded by American country music artist Blake Shelton. It was released in January 2014 as the fourth single from his seventh studio album, Based on a True Story.... The song was written by Wade Kirby and Phil O'Donnell.

Critical reception
Billy Dukes of Taste of Country gave the song a favorable review, writing that "this song isn’t as vocally impressive as some of Shelton’s best ballads, but not every song needs to be 'She Wouldn't Be Gone.' There’s a warmth to the production that complements his genuine intentions." Dukes felt that "some will say the synthesized guitars go a little too far, but most will argue he pushes this moment just far enough."

Commercial performance
"Doin' What She Likes" debuted at number 47 on the U.S. Billboard Country Airplay chart for the week of January 4, 2014. It also debuted at number 47 on the U.S. Billboard Hot Country Songs chart for the week of April 13, 2013. It also debuted at number 84 on the U.S. Billboard Hot 100 chart for the week of February 1, 2014. It also debuted at number 77 on the Canadian Hot 100 chart for the week of February 1, 2014. The song is also Shelton's eleventh consecutive number 1 song, breaking the record previously set by Brad Paisley between 2005 and 2009 for the most consecutive number 1 singles on the country charts since they were first tracked by Nielsen Broadcast Data Systems in January 1990.  The song has sold 533,000 copies in the U.S. as of May 2014.  It was certified Platinum by the RIAA on October 7, 2016, for a million units in sales and streams.

Music video
The music video was directed by Mason Dixon and premiered on February 14, 2014. It starts with a phone conversation between Blake and his then-wife Miranda Lambert. Blake asks Miranda about dinner plans, and he suggests he cook something for her, to which she responds "That sounds romantic!" The song then starts, and footage of Blake singing in a smoky pavement is interspersed with Blake at his house trying to make a nice evening for Miranda. Things only go from bad to worse, however, starting with his margaritas turning out slushy, then his uneasy handling of bread batter, and finally his lighting of candles, which when he leaves a trail of rose petals on the floor and stairs leading the way to the bathroom, flame up and burn the whole house. Firemen (wcfire.com) are then shown trying to fight the huge house fire to no avail, while Blake sings the finale of the song in front of the burning house. The video ends with Miranda calling Blake back, and he says he now insists they go out to dinner and he pick her up instead of them staying home.

Like his video for 2011's "God Gave Me You", (which also has an important Miranda scene), CMT took this video out of rotation after Blake & Miranda's 2015 divorce.

Charts

Year-end charts

Certifications

References

2014 singles
Blake Shelton songs
Song recordings produced by Scott Hendricks
Warner Records Nashville singles
2013 songs
Songs written by Wade Kirby
Songs written by Phil O'Donnell (songwriter)
Country ballads